Tran Dai Nghia High School for the Gifted, also known by its informal nickname Trần Chuyên or by its abbreviation TDN, is an academically selective public school for talented and gifted students from grade 6 to 12 in Ho Chi Minh City, Vietnam. Established in 2000, Tran Dai Nghia High School for the Gifted was the first partially state-funded, semi-boarding school specializing in various subjects, especially foreign languages in Ho Chi Minh city. The school requires entrance exams for admission (with less than 10% acceptance rate).

Establishment
Founded in 2000, the school was named after Professor Trần Đại Nghĩa, a scientist and engineer who invented the SKZ recoilless rifle, as well as redesigning captured weapons to adapt to use among Vietnamese troops during the Vietnam War. The school was set up by repurposing existing facilities of Institution La Salle-Taberd, established by the De La Salle Brothers in 1874 as one of its many educational institutions. It was the first school to have the Intensive English program in Hồ Chí Minh City. 2003 marked the school's first graduating class.

Facilities
The school has many academic facilities, including a library, 2 computer labs, an audiovisual room and a multimedia room. The school also contains one dining hall, a canteen and rooms for students to rest between classes.
The school also has two basketball courts, three badminton courts as well as a volleyball court. In addition there are some basketball half-courts for students to practice inside the school ground.
There are 6 blocks in the school: the main block in the center for the school managing board; 5 A, B, C, D, E blocks for classrooms. Additionally, block E is also used as a dining hall. As the number of students has been increasing every year, the number of classrooms and teachers has also risen.

In 2015, the school opened a second branch in District 2 for students from grades 6–7. With this, the entrance exam now accepts 525-600 students per year instead of the previous 300-400. This new branch includes 1 computer lab, a canteen, multiple sleeping quarters, and two dining halls. 2 out of 4 vice-principals are now working at branch 2. Due to the second branch being in District 2, an area far away from central Sai Gon, there is a shuttle service to help transfer students between the 2 schools.

Library
In 2019, the school opened a library for all students to access. It operates from 8 a.m. to 4 p.m. on weekdays and 8 a.m. to 12 p.m. on Saturdays.

Learning method and students' opportunities
Tran Dai Nghia High School's students are known to have high level of fluency in English, and the school has a reputation for being one of the best education institutions for foreign languages in Ho Chi Minh City. Aside from English, high school students majoring in social subjects are also taught French, Korean, Chinese, Japanese or German as a second foreign language. In addition, classes of grade 10, 11 and 12 are ranged in to specializing classes such as English majoring class, Math majoring class, Literature majoring class, Chemistry majoring class, Physics majoring class and Biology majoring class. There are also triple-subjected classes: Math-Chemistry-Physics and Math-Literature-English classes. A growing number of study abroad scholarships are won by students, a fact on which the school prides itself.

Class schedule
The school is a semi-boarding one in which students stay from 7:00 am to 4:30 pm for grade 8-12. Grade 6-7 stay from 7:30 am to 3:45 pm.

Classes are broken into 4 periods for grade 6-9 students and 5 periods for the rest in the morning. In the afternoon, classes start at 1:15 and usually lasts until 4:30, with a break from 2:45 pm to 3:00 pm. On Saturday, students in selection teams gather to take extra classes on the subject they major. After that, they can go home or use the school's facilities.

Extracurricular sports classes are available from 4:30 to 5:00 pm. As these classes are taught in the school yard, students are prohibited from entering the school yard for safety reasons.

Extracurricular activities

Athletics
Basketball, badminton, volleyball, chess, football and martial arts classes are also carried out after school, which is widely popular to students who want to improve their physical and mental condition. Half-court basketball is also regularly played after school between students. Sports competitions are held twice a year.

Competitions
There are a lot of contests and competitions so that students of all sorts can participate.
 Singing contests (both in Vietnamese and foreign languages)
 National teachers’ day celebration
 Science fairs
 Spring festival
 Sports competitions
 Well-bred students
 Creativity Contest

Clubs
 Journalism Club
 Handmade Club
 Photography Club (Specture)
 Art Club
 German Culture Club
 Lua Xanh Skills Club
 Papersane Book Club
 Japanese Culture Club
 American Culture Club
 Vietnamese Culture Club
 Korean Club
 English Club
 Music Club
 Chinese Culture Club
 Physics Club
Public Speaking & Debate Club
 Environment Club
 Model UN Club
The Mersy Act
 Career Venture TDN
 NGOT LAB Baking Project 
 PLASBIT Campaign
 SPORTIFY Sports Project
 CINEX Cinematography Project

School publications
Tran Dai Nghia High School releases a biennial magazine titled "Nội san Trần Đại Nghĩa". This magazine includes selective writings and artworks by teachers and students. Currently, the magazine is in its sixth issue. The school also publishes yearbooks, published perennially instead of annually.

An active student-run photoblog, called "Humans of TDN", can be found on Facebook. Mimicking the "Humans of New York", it publishes photos and interviews of the school's staff and students.

References

High schools in Ho Chi Minh City
High schools for the gifted in Vietnam